Radovan is a commune in Dolj County, Oltenia, Romania with a population of 1,520 people. It is composed of three villages: Fântânele, Radovan and Târnava. It also included Întorsura village until 2004, when it was split off to form a separate commune.

References

Communes in Dolj County
Localities in Oltenia